Buarth-y-Gaer is an Iron Age hillfort or enclosure on the summit of Mynydd-y-Gaer,  above sea level. It is in Briton Ferry community, near Neath, in Neath Port Talbot, South Wales. A large hilltop enclosure is bounded by a single bank and ditch. Within the enclosed area is a Bronze Age burial mound.

Location
The hillfort is on the highest point of Mynydd-y-Gaer. Mynydd-y-Gaer has a rounded hilltop, with grassland fields and stone walls running up to Buarth-y-Gaer. The village of Baglan is at the foot of the hill,  to the south-west. A slightly higher mountain, Foel Fynyddau lies to the east. Although the hillfort lies within Briton Ferry community, the south and east banks of the fort are on the boundary with Baglan community.

Earthworks
The fort is defined by a single bank and ditch which are roughly circular. Small-scale early quarrying has removed some of the bank from the south side. The remainder has several modern gaps and an original entrance on the west side. The bank stands half a metre above the interior, with a  drop from the bank to the bottom of the ditch. The site is a scheduled monument. Although the hill name is 'Mynydd-y-Gaer' (Mountain of the Fort) and the scheduling classifies it as a hillfort, the site shows little evidence of defensibility or fortification, and may be better termed an enclosure or 'defended enclosure'.

A Bronze Age burial mound, which pre-dates the hillfort, stands within the enclosed area as the only internal feature.

References

See also
List of Scheduled Monuments in Neath Port Talbot

Archaeological sites in Neath Port Talbot
Hillforts in Neath Port Talbot
Bronze Age sites in Wales
Briton Ferry